Alessandro Martelli (1876–1934) was an Italian academic and politician. He served as the minister of national economy in the cabinet led by Benito Mussolini between 1928 and 1929.

Early life and education
Martelli was born in Caltanissetta on 25 November 1876. He graduated from the Institute of Higher Studies in Florence in July 1900.

Career and activities
Following his graduation Martelli joined the academy and became professor of mineralogy and geology at the University of Florence between 1910 and 1927. He also served as a faculty member at the University of Rome in the field of geology in 1927. 

Martelli participated in both Italo-Turkish War (1911–1912) and World War I. He took part in March on Rome in October 1922. He was elected to the Chamber of Deputies in 1924 for the National Fascist Party and served there for two terms. In 1926 he was made undersecretary of transports. On 9 July 1928 he was appointed minister of national economy, replacing Giuseppe Belluzzo in the post. Martelli's term ended on 12 September 1929. Following this incident the ministry was replaced by the ministry of guilds.

Later he served as the head of the Italian automotive gasoline company Agip. Martelli was named as a senator in March 1934.

Personal life and death
In February 1904 Martelli married Dolores Corsi with whom he had two sons. He died in Florence on 5 October 1934 and was buried there in the Vinci cemetery.

Awards
Martelli was the recipient of the following:

 : Knight of the Order of the Crown of Italy (11 June 1916)
 : Officer of the Order of the Crown of Italy (8 January 1920)
 : Commander of the Order of the Crown of Italy (2 January 1921)
 : Grand officer of Order of the Crown of Italy (31 January 1926)
 Grand cordon of the Order of the Crown of Italy (25 October 1932)
 : Commander of the Order of Saints Maurice and Lazarus (9 June 1930)

References

External links

1876 births
1934 deaths
Deputies of Legislature XXVII of the Kingdom of Italy
Deputies of Legislature XXVIII of the Kingdom of Italy
Finance ministers of Italy
University of Florence alumni
Members of the Senate of the Kingdom of Italy
Commanders of the Order of Saints Maurice and Lazarus
Mussolini Cabinet
Academic staff of the University of Florence
20th-century Italian geologists
National Fascist Party politicians
Italian military personnel of World War I
Italian military personnel of the Italo-Turkish War
People from Caltanissetta